Papiernia  is a settlement in the administrative district of Gmina Odolanów, within Ostrów Wielkopolski County, Greater Poland Voivodeship, in west-central Poland.

References

Villages in Ostrów Wielkopolski County